The Georgian Bay Littoral (also called the Georgian Bay Biosphere Reserve) is a UNESCO Biosphere Reserve located in Ontario, Canada.  The biosphere was the thirteenth in Canada, and covers the Thirty Thousand Islands area of eastern Georgian Bay, one of the world's largest fresh water archipelagos.

See also
 List of Biosphere Reserves in Canada

References

External links

Biosphere reserves of Canada
Geography of Parry Sound District
Georgian Bay

2004 establishments in Ontario